Anthony John Fowler (born 10 March 1991) is a British professional boxer. As an amateur, he won a bronze medal at the 2013 World Championships and gold at the 2014 Commonwealth Games.

Amateur career
Fowler competed at the 2013 World Championships. He won four fights including beating 2nd seed Dmytro Mytrafanov and 7th seed Stefan Härtel, winning the bronze medal along with Artem Chebotarev of Russia.

Fowler entered the 2014 Commonwealth Games Middleweight boxing competition at the round of 32, beating Cypriot Kyriakos Spanosby unanimous decision. Fowler continued to the final, defeating Kieran Smith in the round of 16, Nickson Otieno Abaka in the quarter-final, and Benny Muziyo in the semi-final, all by unanimous decision. Fowler claimed gold in the competition on 2 August 2014, defeating Indian Vijender Singh by unanimous decision.

Fowler competed for the British Lionhearts squad at the 2015 World Series of Boxing competition.

Fowler fought Asian Games quarter-finalist Zhou Di of the China Dragons in York Hall, Bethnal Green London, on 15 January 2015. Fowler comfortably controlled the opening two rounds, however in the third round the fight took a dramatic turn when a clash of heads left Fowler with a gaping cut to the forehead, forcing the referee to stop the fight.

On 30 January 2015 Fowler fought again on behalf of the British Lionhearts to face Moroccan Atlas Lions middleweight contender, Said Harnouf. Fowler dominated the first two rounds of the fight knocking his opponent down to the canvas three times. During the second round a cut Fowler sustained two weeks earlier was re-opened though the referee allowed the fight to continue. From here Fowler clearly changed strategy in order to protect the cut in order to finish the fight. Despite this setback Fowler continued to challenge his opponent and was declared the unanimous victor at the end of the five fight bout.

On 26 February Fowler went on to win his fight for the British lionhearts against his opponent Misael Rodriguez (fight for the Mexican Guerreros) by split decision to continue his winning streak in the 2015 world series boxing.

Anthony Fowler's Olympic dream was shattered in Rio as he was floored in the second and lost all three rounds to middleweight beast Zhanibek Alimkhanuly of Kazakhstan.

Fowler finished his amateur career in 2016 with a record of 190-19.

Professional career

Fowler vs. Gelkins 
Fowler made his professional debut on 27 May 2017 at Bramall Lane in Sheffield, on the undercard of Kell Brook vs. Errol Spence Jr., scoring a first-round knockout (KO) over Arturs Geikins.

Fowler vs. Fitzgerald 
Fowler suffered his first defeat at the hands of Scott Fitzgerald via split decision (SD). The bout took place on 30 Mar 2019 at the Echo Arena in Liverpool.

Fowler vs. Harper 
On 7 August, 2020, Fowler fought and defeated Adam Harper via a seventh round TKO.

Fowler vs. Fortea 
On 20 March, 2021, Fowler fought IBF #15 ranked Jorge Fortea. Fowler won the fight via KO in three rounds.

Fowler vs. Smith 
On 9th Oct 2021, Anthony Fowler was beaten by fellow Liverpudlian, Liam Smith (boxer), suffering an 8th round TKO loss.

Personal life
Fowler is a first cousin of former Liverpool F.C. and England footballer Robbie Fowler.

Professional boxing record

References

External links
 Official website for Anthony Fowler (archived)
  (archive)
 Anthony Fowler - Profile, News Archive & Current Rankings at Box.Live

 
 
 
 

1991 births
Living people
English male boxers
Middleweight boxers
Commonwealth Games gold medallists for England
Boxers at the 2014 Commonwealth Games
Boxers from Liverpool
AIBA World Boxing Championships medalists
Olympic boxers of Great Britain
Boxers at the 2016 Summer Olympics
Commonwealth Games medallists in boxing
Boxers at the 2015 European Games
European Games competitors for Great Britain
Medallists at the 2014 Commonwealth Games